Ankyrin repeat and sterile alpha motif domain containing 4B is a protein that in humans is encoded by the ANKS4B gene. The gene is also known as HARP (Harmonin-interacting, ankyrin repeat-containing protein).  Ankyrin repeats mediate protein-protein interactions in very diverse families of proteins.

Model organisms
				
Model organisms have been used in the study of ANKS4B function. A conditional knockout mouse line, called Anks4btm2a(EUCOMM)Wtsi was generated as part of the International Knockout Mouse Consortium program — a high-throughput mutagenesis project to generate and distribute animal models of disease to interested scientists — at the Wellcome Trust Sanger Institute.

Male and female animals underwent a standardized phenotypic screen to determine the effects of deletion. Twenty six tests were carried out on mutant mice, but no significant abnormalities were observed.

References

Further reading 
 

Human proteins
Genes mutated in mice